Colour Me Wednesday are an English indie pop/pop punk band from West London, England, built around sisters Jen and Harriet Doveton. The band are noted for their melodic guitar pop, politicised lyrics and DIY punk method, including producing their own recordings, artwork and promotional videos.

History
Colour Me Wednesday formed in Uxbridge in 2007, initially performing local gigs with various line-ups, and settled as a permanent band in 2009, with Danny Gardner on bass and Sam Brackley on drums. Brackley had previously played bass, with Helen Meragi on drums. They self-recorded and self-released their debut CDr EP What to do in an Emergency that year.

In 2010 and 2011, a series of self-produced YouTube videos for tracks from their follow up Sampler EP brought them to wider attention in DIY punk and indiepop circles.

In 2012, Carmela Pietrangelo (of ¡Ay Carmela!) joined as new bassist. In June, the band released debut single "Shut" as a digital download with accompanying video, taken from the album I Thought It Was Morning, released by Discount Horse Records in July and described by The Girls Are as "an exceptionally assured debut"; the album was self-recorded and included new versions of EP tracks as well as a collaboration with former King Blues keyboardist and solo artist Perkie. A promo video for the track "(I'm Not Coming To Your) BBQ" accompanied the release of the album, which was re-released in Japan and Canada the following year; "Shut" was also issued on vinyl in Canada. The same year, the band was invited to play the Indietracks festival in 2012 and subsequently the following year in 2013.

2014 saw the band release a split album with Spoonboy on California's Lauren Records, supported by a US tour including appearances at Plan-It X festival and New York Popfest. A promo video was released for lead track "Sugar-Coated".

In 2015, Colour Me Wednesday made a return to the Indietracks festival, joined by new drummer Jaca Freer and guitarist Laura Ankles (both also of ¡Ay Carmela!). This line-up released its first recordings in 2016 as the Anyone and Everyone EP, available on multiple formats in the UK, US, France and Japan (as part of 2670 Records' Incompatible compilation). The EP was supported by a UK and European tour and a promotional video for lead track "Don't Tell Anyone"; the group also played at Madrid Popfest.

In 2017, Colour Me Wednesday band toured with Lemuria. They have also played with Waxahatchee, Laura Stevenson, Kate Nash, Grace Petrie, Doe, LVL UP, the Homosexuals, Thee Faction and Josie Long. Also in 2017 they released a new track online, a version of Demi Lovato's "Cool for the Summer". Later that year their debut album was reissued in Indonesia.

In 2018, Colour Me Wednesday released second album Counting Pennies in the Afterlife, produced by MJ of Hookworms. Preview single "Sunriser" was released in May with an accompanying video. Additionally, a single of the previously-released "Don't Tell Anyone" and new b-side "Blossom" was released in April on U.S. label American Laundromat.

Style and influences
Colour Me Wednesday have been likened musically to contemporary artists such as Lemuria and Waxahatchee and older indie bands such as the Sundays, the Popguns, the Breeders and Blake Babies, and lyrically to ONSIND as well as earlier political new wave/indie bands such as the Clash, the Jam and the Housemartins.

Members
Current
 Jen Doveton – lead vocals, melodica (2007–present)
 Harriet Doveton – guitar, bass, backing vocals (2007–present)
 Laura Ankles – bass, guitar, backing vocals (2015–present)
 Jodi M Burn – drums, percussion (2015–present)

Former
 Carmela Pietrangelo – bass (2012–2015)
 Danny Gardner – bass (2009–12)
 Sam Brackley – drums, keyboards, horns (2009–2015), bass (2007–2009) 
 Helen Meragi – drums (2007–2009)

Timeline

Discography

Singles/EPs
What to do in an Emergency EP, CDr, 2009  [self released]
Sampler EP, CDr, 2011  [self released]
"Shut" b/w "What Happened" 7", Kingfisher Bluez, 2014
Anyone and Everyone EP, CDr/7"/Cass/DD, Dovetown/Krod Records/Wiener Records, 2016
"Don't Tell Anyone" b/w "Blossom" 7" (Pink & White Marble Vinyl), American Laundromat Records, 2018

Albums
I Thought It Was Morning, LP/CD/DD, Discount Horse/Dovetown, 2013; CD/Cass, 2670 Records/Bitter Melody records, 2014 [extra track]
Counting Pennies in the Afterlife, 2018

Compilations
Incompatible, CD/DD, 2670 Records, 2016 [combines tracks from 2014 split LP and 2016 EP]

Compilation appearances
"What Happened" on Nobody’s Business, LP/DD, Candy Twist Records, 2014
Split [w/Spoonboy], LP/CD/Cass/DD, Lauren Records/Dovetown, 2014
"Not My Turf" on Hell Hath No Fury, Vol. 2, CD/DD, Hell Hath No Fury Records, 2018

References

Further reading
2015 interview
March 2016 interview
May 2016 interview
November 2016 interview
March 2018 interview
April 2018 interview

Underground punk scene in the United Kingdom
British indie pop groups
Musical groups established in 2007
Musical quartets
English pop punk groups
Feminist musicians
Political music groups